Domingo de Soto, O.P. (1494 – 15 November 1560) was a Spanish Dominican priest and Scholastic theologian born in Segovia (Spain), and died in Salamanca (Spain), at the age of 66. He is best known as one of the founders of international law and of the Spanish Thomistic philosophical and theological movement known as the School of Salamanca. He is also known for his contributions to Mechanical Physics.

Biography
De Soto was born in Segovia. Trained in Alcalá, Spain, and Paris, France, before being made professor of philosophy at Alcalá in 1520, he left academia in 1524 to join the Dominicans and returned to take the chair of theology at Salamanca University in 1532. He is best known in economic theory and theological circles for his writings defending the price differential in usury as compatible with "just price" from the perspective of the Thomists.

He held powerful positions, including Confessor of Holy Roman Emperor Charles V and the emperor's representative at the Council of Trent. He died in Salamanca.

Thought

Usury
De Soto was concerned about the complexity that had emerged from unclear moral standards of usury. He complained that the merchants had invented convoluted schemes in order to meet the conflicting demands of church leaders. His position should be seen within the background of his Dominican background and historical context. De Soto was involved in an active debate in the medieval era on the sterility of money and the requirements of natural law given this sterility. His rationale on interest is explained by Langholm. Woods and D'Emic characterize de Soto's attitude toward usury in significantly different ways. D'Emic reports that De Soto thought voluntary contributions given from borrower to lender in gratitude were acceptable, but strictly forbid the lender from pressuring the borrower. He also asserts that De Soto thought lenders were permitted to hope for such contributions along with other motives of benevolence and friendship, but regarded the sole motivation of financial gain as immoral "mental usury". Woods, on the other hand, reports that De Soto did not believe Christ had declared usury to be sinful at all, and did not believe that  had anything to do with lending at interest.

Mechanics

In 1551, Domingo de Soto became the first to state that a body in free fall accelerates uniformly. This key concept in physics was essential for the posterior studies of the gravity laws by Galileo and Newton. In the 20th century, Pierre Duhem credited him with important achievements in dynamics and viewed his work as a forerunner of modern mechanics.

Law
In 1556, Soto published a treatise on law, De Justitia and Jure (Justice and the Law), that is considered a foundational text in the general theory of law, and international law, in particular. Like his teacher Francisco de Vitoria, Soto helped to provide a modern insight to the Spanish conquests in the New World, helping to build the concept of people's rights, including the right to private property of the native Americans. Soto is also famous for having defended the rights of the legitimate poor against imperial and urban policies restricting access to poor relief.

Works
Summulae, 1529. (A manual of logic.)
De ratione tegendi et detegendi secretum, 1541
In dialecticam Aristotelis commentarii, 1544
In VIII libros physicorum, 1545 (An influential commentary on Aristotle's Physics.)
Deliberacion en la causa de los pobres, 1545
De natura et gratia libri III, 1547 (A treatise on original sin and grace, written from a Thomistic point of view.)
Comment. in Ep. ad Romanos, 1550
In IV sent. libros comment. 1555-6.
De justitia et jure libri X, 1556 (A treatise on law.)
 Jaime Brufau Prats and Sixto Sanchez-Lauro, eds. Domingo de Soto, OP., Relecciones y opúsculos (Salamanca, Editorial San Esteban, 2011).

Notes

References
History of Economic Thought "Salamanca School"
 
 Decock, W. (2016). Domingo de Soto: De iustitia et iure (1553-1554). In: S. Dauchy et al. (eds.), The Formation and Transmission of Western Legal Culture. 150 Books that Made the Law in the Age of Printing, 2016, 84-86.
 Decock, W. (ed.), Schwartz D. (introd.), Possemiers, J., Lasquety-Reyes (transl.). Domingo de Soto: Deliberation on the Cause of the Poor, CLP Academic. ISBN 978-1-949-01109-8

External links

1494 births
1560 deaths
People from Segovia
Catholic philosophers
16th-century Spanish Roman Catholic theologians
Spanish Dominicans
16th-century Spanish Roman Catholic priests
Participants in the Council of Trent
16th-century male writers
Latin commentators on Aristotle
Mercantilists
Academic staff of the University of Salamanca
16th-century Latin-language writers
16th-century Spanish jurists
16th-century Spanish philosophers
School of Salamanca